Melville Amadeus Henry Douglas Heddle de La Caillemotte de Massue de Ruvigné, 9th Marquis of Ruvigny and 15th of Raineval (25 April 1868 – 6 October 1921) was a British genealogist and author, who was twice president of the Legitimist Jacobite League of Great Britain and Ireland.

Biography
Ruvigny was born in London to Colonel Charles Henry Theodore Bruce de Massue de Ruvigné, soi-disant Marquis of Ruvigny and Raineval, a native of Switzerland, by his marriage to Margaret Melville Moodie, a daughter of George Moodie, of Cocklaw and Dunbog in Fife, Scotland. Ruvigny's grandfather, Lieutenant Lloyd Henry de Ruvynes, an Irishman of French origin, changed his name to "de Massue de Ruvigné", because of his descent from a daughter of Henri de Massue, 1st Marquis de Rouvigny.

In one of the few sources to discuss the de Massue family, the genealogist and College of Arms herald George Edward Cokayne states that at the death of the 1st Marquis's son, Henri de Massue, 2nd Marquis de Rouvigny, created Earl of Galway, "all his honours, both French and English, became extinct. This statement is made after a careful investigation of all the facts".The genealogist Guy Stair Sainty viewed Ruvigny as "a very fine scholar, but occasionally his romantic (in the 19th century sense) inclinations got the better of him, and that is certainly the case with regard to his own title. He was a female line heir, and he simply ignored the provisions regarding nobiliary succession introduced post 1814..." "Ruvigny... since the male heirs of this family were extinct, considered himself the heir since the original patent allowed for mixed succession (like so many French creations). He ignored the fact that after the restoration all French titles became inheritable by male heirs only. His argument was that he was the heir according to the original patent- unfortunately he was treating this title like a British title, i.e. that the title itself was what mattered. However in France before the revolution territorial titles like this were tied to the original lordship which had been "erected" into a barony, county, marquisate or dukedom, and possession of the title required possession of the land. Ruvigny's claim would have been stronger (although not sufficient) if he had inherited the property in addition to the title."

On 30 August 1893 Ruvigny married Rose Amalia Gaminara, daughter of Poncrazio Gaminara of Tumaco, Colombia, by his wife, Doña Amalia Cabezas, daughter of Don Felipe Cabezas, LL.D. of the University of Quito, Ecuador.

Ruvigny was an early member of the Jacobite Order of the White Rose (1886–1915), though he found the sentimental nature of the Order restrictive. In 1891, he co-founded the Legitimist Jacobite League of Great Britain and Ireland, with Herbert Vivian and Ruaraidh Erskine, as a more political and radical Jacobite society. He was President of the League in 1893, 1894 and 1897. The League was one of the principal organizations driving the Neo-Jacobite Revival of the 1890s. In 1898 he was made a Knight of the Order of Charles III by the Spanish Carlist claimant Don Carlos, Duke of Madrid, known as "King Carlos VII".

Ruvigny was a prolific author of genealogical works and a committed member of the Roman Catholic Church, which he joined in 1902.  He died in a London nursing home and was succeeded by his second son, Charles, "Comte de la Caillemotte", his first son having died unexpectedly shortly before the First World War.

Publications
Moutray of Seafield and Roscobie, now of Favour Royal, Co. Tyrone: an Historical and Genealogical memoir of the family in Scotland, England, Ireland and America
The Family of Hicks (London: Privately Printed, 1902)
 The Plantagenet Roll of the Blood Royal, 5 vols. (London, 1903–1911)
The Jacobite Peerage, Baronetage, Knightage and Grants of Honour (Edinburgh: T.C. & E.C. Jack, 1904)
Morris of Ballybeggan and Castle Morris (s.l.: Privately Printed, 1904)
The Moodie Book: Being an Account of the Families of Melsetter, Muir, Cocklaw, Blairhill, Bryanton, Gilchorn, Pitmuies, Arbekie, Masterton, etc., etc. (s.l.: Privately Printed, 1906)
The Nobilities of Europe (London: Melville and Company, 1909)
The Legitimist Kalender for the Year of our Lord 1910 (London: The Forget-Me-Not Royalist Club, 1910)
The Titled Nobility of Europe: An International Peerage (London: Harrison & Sons, 1914)
The Roll of Honour: a biographical record of all members of His Majesty's naval and military forces who have fallen in the war, 2 vols. (London: The Standard Art Book Co., Ltd., 1916)

References

1868 births
1921 deaths
People from Fulham
British genealogists
Jacobite propagandists
Scottish Jacobites
Neo-Jacobite Revival